Maigret in New York (other English-language titles are Maigret in New York's Underworld and Inspector Maigret in New York's Underworld) is a detective novel by Belgian writer Georges Simenon, featuring his character inspector Jules Maigret. The novel was written between February 27 to March 6, 1946, in Sainte-Marguerite-du-Lac-Masson, Quebec, Canada. The book was published in 1947 by Presses de la Cité.

Translations
The book has been translated and published under different titles: in 1955 as Maigret in New York and as Maigret in New York's Underworld , in 1956 as Inspector Maigret in New York's Underworld, all translated by Adrienne Foulke; in 2016 as Maigret in New York translated by Linda Coverdale.

The first German translation by Bernhard Jolles was published by Kiepenheuer & Witsch in 1956.

Adaptation
Maigret à New York,  starring Jean Richard and Raymond Pellegrin (1990).

Literature
Maurice Piron, Michel Lemoine, L'Univers de Simenon, guide des romans et nouvelles (1931-1972) de Georges Simenon, Presses de la Cité, 1983, p. 306-307

External links

Maigret at trussel.com

References

1947 Belgian novels
Maigret novels
Novels set in France
Novels set in the 20th century